Sandeshkhali Assembly constituency is an assembly constituency in North 24 Parganas district in the Indian state of West Bengal. It is reserved for scheduled tribes.

Overview
As per orders of the Delimitation Commission, 123 Sandeshkhali Assembly constituency (ST) is composed of the following: Sandeshkhali I community development block, and Beramajur I, Beramajur II, Durgamandap, Jeliakhali, Korakati, Manipur and Sandeshkhali gram panchayats of Sandeshkhali II community development block.

Sandeshkhali Assembly constituency (ST) is part of 18. Basirhat (Lok Sabha constituency). It was earlier part of Jaynagar (Lok Sabha constituency).

Members of Legislative Assembly

Election results

2021

2016

2011

.# Swing calculated on Congress+Trinamool Congress vote percentages taken together in 2006.

1977-2006
In the 2006 assembly elections, Abani Roy of CPI(M) won the 98 Sandeshkhali (SC) seat defeating his nearest rival Gita Mondal of Trinamool Congress. Contests in most years were multi cornered but only winners and runners are being mentioned. Kanti Biswas of CPI(M) defeated Ranjit Kumar Das of Trinamool Congress/Congress in 2001 and 1996. Dhiren Mondal of CPI(M) defeated Krishna Pada Patra of Congress in 1991. Kumud Ranjan Biswas of CPI(M) defeated Ranjit Kumar Das of Congress in 1987 and 1977, and Ananata Kumar Bera of Congress in 1982.

1951-1972
Debendra Nath Sinha of Congress won in 1972. Sarat Sarder of CPI(M) won in 1971 and 1969. Debendra Nath Sinha of Congress won in 1967. Ananta Kumar Baidya of Congress won in 1962. Haran Chandra Mondal, Independent, won in 1957. In independent India's first election in 1951, Jyotish Chandra Roy Sardar of Congress and Hemanta Kumar Ghoshal of CPI won the Haroa Sandeshkhali joint seat.

References

Assembly constituencies of West Bengal
Politics of North 24 Parganas district